Frank Partridge may refer to:

Frank C. Partridge (1861–1943), United States senator from Vermont
Frank Partridge (soldier) (1924–1964), Australian soldier, recipient of the Victoria Cross and television quiz champion
Frank Partridge (bishop) (1877–1941), bishop of Portsmouth, 1937–1941